Now Deh-e Pasikhan (also Romanized as Now Deh-e Pasīkhān) is a village in Molla Sara Rural District, in the Central District of Shaft County, Gilan Province, Iran. At the 2006 census, its population was 157, in 34 families.

References 

Populated places in Shaft County